Leonard Herbert Evers (25 May 1926-18 February 1985) was an Australian novelist and writer for children who was born in Brisbane, Queensland.

After dropping out of high school at age fourteen, Len Evers joined the Australian Imperial Force during World War II and later served with the Occupation Force in Japan. Following the war he trained as a teacher and later attained an Arts Degree from Sydney University and a Diploma in Psychology. He left teaching in 1960 to become a psychologist in the NSW prison service.

He wrote four novels for adults and was awarded the Children's Book of the Year Award: Older Readers for his work The Racketty Street Gang in 1962.
 
Len Evers died in 1985.

Bibliography

Novels 
 Pattern of Conquest (1954)
 Long Under Darkness (1957)
 Make Way for Tomorrow (1960)
 Fall Among Thieves (1968)

Young Adult fiction 
 The Racketty Street Gang (Hodder & Stoughton, 1961)
 Danny's Wonderful Uncle (Thomas Nelson, 1963) illustrated by George Adamson

References

1926 births
1985 deaths
20th-century Australian writers
Australian children's writers